The Vilayet of Angora or Ankara was a first-level administrative division (vilayet) of the Ottoman Empire, centered on the city of Angora (Ankara) in north-central Anatolia, which included most of ancient Galatia.

Demographics
The accuracy of the population figures ranges from "approximate" to "merely conjectural" depending on the region from which they were gathered. As of 1920, the population was described as being mainly Muslim from Turkey, and Armenian Christians.

Economy
It was an agricultural country, depending for its prosperity on its grain, wool and the mohair obtained from the Angora goats. An important industry was carpet-weaving at Kırşehir and Kayseri. There were mines of silver, copper, lignite and salt, and many hot springs, including some of great repute medicinally. Rock salt and fuller's earth was also mined in the area.

Weaving was a popular industry in the vilayet but declined after the introduction of the railroad, where locals would export wool and mohair instead of weaving it. A small carpet industry was also found in the region in the early 20th century.

Administrative divisions

Sanjaks of the Vilayet:
 Sanjak of Ankara (Ankara, Ayaş, Beypazarı, Sivrihisar, Çubuk, Nallıhan, Haymana, Kızılcahamam, Mihalıççık, Balâ, Kalecik)
 Sanjak of Bozok (Yozgat, Akdağmadeni, Boğazlıyan)
 Sanjak of Kayseri  (Kayseri, Develi, İncesu)
 Sanjak of Kırsehir (Kırşehir, Mucur, Hacıbektaş, Keskin, Çiçekdağı, Avanos)
 Sanjak of Çorum (Çorum, Osmancık, Kargı, Sungurlu, İskilip)

Villages
There was an Armenian village called Stanoz in proximity to Angora. Much of the Armenian population was lost after the Armenian genocide. By 2020 there was a cemetery remaining.

References

External links
 
 

 
Vilayets of the Ottoman Empire in Anatolia
History of Ankara
History of Ankara Province
History of Çorum Province
History of Kayseri Province
History of Kırıkkale Province
History of Kırşehir Province
History of Yozgat Province
1867 establishments in the Ottoman Empire
1922 disestablishments in the Ottoman Empire